Wang Houjun (September 16, 1943 – November 21, 2012) was a Chinese international football player and coach.

Playing career
Wang was born in Ningbo, Republic of China on 16 September 1943.  Thanks to his football fan father's influence, he began his football career when age 10. He named in the squad for the Shanghai Football Team in 1961, and enters the China national football team in 1965. In the early 70s, He was appointed captain of national team.

Management career
Wang Houjun retired in 1975 and worked as Fang Renqiu's assistant coach of Shanghai Football Team. He has been named as head coach of Shanghai Football team in 1983, succeeding Fang Renqiu whose retired from football after winning 5th National Games of the People's Republic of China.

Throughout the 1990s, the Chinese Football Association were demanding more professionalism from their football teams, Shanghai gathered sponsorship from a local company and founding Shanghai Shenhua F.C. in December 1993, Wang Houjun was replaced by Xu Genbao.

In 1995, the newly established Shanghai Pudong F.C. have announced the appointment of Wang Houjun to their first head coach. He led them to become China League Two champions that year, and promotion into the Jia B. However, he resigned for health reasons in the middle of 1996 season. In 1997, he was invited by Guangzhou Songri's new head coach Xu Genbao named as their team leader, but resigned soon.

For the development of youth football, Wang Houjun started a private football school in Shanghai from 1998.

Death
He died of uremia in Shanghai, China, on November 21, 2012, at the age of 69.

Honours

Player

Shanghai Football Team
Chinese Jia-A League: 1961, 1962

Manager

Shanghai Football Team
Chinese FA Cup: 1991

Shanghai Pudong
China League Two: 1995

References

External links
Wang Houjun Biography at Shanghai Sports

1943 births
2012 deaths
Chinese footballers
Footballers from Zhejiang
Chinese football managers
China international footballers
Sportspeople from Ningbo
Shanghai Shenhua F.C. players
Footballers at the 1974 Asian Games
Association football forwards
Asian Games competitors for China